Nashwan Haidar Al-Harazi (born 29 November 1986 in Sana'a) is a Yemeni gymnast. He was the first Yemeni gymnast to compete in the Olympics, at the 2008 Games in Beijing.

References

External links
 

Yemeni male artistic gymnasts
Olympic gymnasts of Yemen
People from Sanaa
Living people
Gymnasts at the 2002 Asian Games
Gymnasts at the 2010 Asian Games
Gymnasts at the 2008 Summer Olympics
1987 births
Asian Games competitors for Yemen